Brigadier General Ralph Hospital was born January 27, 1891, in Washington, D.C. He was commissioned in November 1913 as a Field Artillery officer and saw service with the 15th Cavalry Regiment during the Mexican Campaign in Douglas, Arizona and Sierra Blanca, Texas. He served as an Artillery officer in France during World War I and then took an instructor job at Cornell University in Ithaca, New York until the mid-1920s.  Major Hospital served with the 15th Field Artillery Regiment during its period under the Hawaiian Division in 1925, and returned to the states in 1926 to attend Command and General Staff College at Fort Leavenworth, Kansas.  He was a Distinguished Graduate and soon returned to Ithaca to instruct ROTC again.

Lieutenant Colonel Hospital pinned on Colonel in 1941 and saw service in World War II, first as commander of the 75th Field Artillery Brigade and then was frocked to Brigadier General and placed as Commanding General of the 91st Division Artillery. In Spring 1944 they sailed for north Africa and then Italy, making the push for the Po River Valley and the Gothic Line. General Hospital  was awarded the Silver Star for his heroism in the Italian campaigns. He retired in January 1951 and was officially promoted to Brigadier General in February 1951 on the U.S. Army Retired List. He returned to Ithaca, New York, as Professor of Military Studies and Tactics until the mid-1960s.

General Hospital died on December 20, 1972, and was buried at Arlington National Cemetery near the JFK grove.

General Hospital's awards include the Silver Star, Legion of Merit, Bronze Star Medal, Army Commendation Medal, and the Italian Medal for Military Valor.  His campaign awards include the Mexican Campaign, World War I Victory, American Defense, American Campaign, European-Middle Eastern-North Africa Campaign Medal with three bronze campaign stars, the Army of Occupation Service Medal, and the World War II Victory Medal.

Hospital is the maternal grandfather of musician John Flansburgh, one half of the alternative rock band They Might Be Giants, and Paxus Calta (born Earl S. Flansburgh), anti-nuclear activist.  He was the father-in-law of the late Earl Flansburgh, famed Boston architect, and father to Polly Flansburgh, owner of Boston by Foot.

External links
Generals of World War II

1891 births
1972 deaths
Burials at Arlington National Cemetery
Cornell University faculty
People from Washington, D.C.
Recipients of the Silver Star
United States Army Command and General Staff College alumni
United States Army generals of World War II
United States Army generals
United States Army personnel of World War I
United States Army Field Artillery Branch personnel